Pontian Utara was a federal constituency in Johor, Malaysia, that was represented in the Dewan Rakyat from 1959 to 1974.

The federal constituency was created in the 1974 redistribution and was mandated to return a single member to the Dewan Rakyat under the first past the post voting system.

History
It was abolished in 1974 when it was redistributed.

Representation history

State constituency

Election results

References

Defunct Johor federal constituencies